The men's 3 metre springboard diving event was held on 11 October 2010.

Results
Green denotes finalists

References
 Reports

Aquatics at the 2010 Commonwealth Games